Stanimira Petrova (born 16 December 1990) is a Bulgarian female boxer.

She competed at the 2016 Summer Olympics in Rio de Janeiro, in the women's flyweight.

She won a gold medal in bantamweight at the 2014 AIBA Women's World Boxing Championships.

References

External links

1990 births
Living people
Bulgarian women boxers
Olympic boxers of Bulgaria
Boxers at the 2016 Summer Olympics
Boxers at the 2015 European Games
Boxers at the 2019 European Games
Boxers at the 2020 Summer Olympics
European Games medalists in boxing
European Games gold medalists for Bulgaria
Flyweight boxers
AIBA Women's World Boxing Championships medalists
21st-century Bulgarian women